Ar begs (in Russian chronicles "Арские князья") was a formation of Noqrat Tatars' nobility, served to Muscovy in 16th–17th century. In 14th–15th centuries they were rulers of semi-independent duchy in the middle Cheptsa, nowadays Udmurtia. At the first time, their lands were under Kazan Khanate's and later under Russian influence. Begs also participated in wars for Udmurtia between Kazan and Muscovy.

Several 
Russian noble families descended from the Ar begs include the Devetyarov, Kasimov, Yaushev and others.

See also
 Udmurt people

Tatar
History of Tatarstan
History of Udmurtia